KRHC (1340 AM) was a radio station that broadcast a country music format. Formerly licensed to Burnet, Texas, United States, the station was owned by Munbilla Broadcasting Properties Ltd. and featured programming from ABC Radio .

History
The station went on the air as KBEY on 26 March 2004. On 18 January 2005, the station changed its call sign to KRHC.

The call sign KRHC used to be the call sign for the student-operated radio station at Rio Hondo Community College in Whittier, California in the 1970s throughout most of the 80'.

On 14 December 2011, the station surrendered its licence to the Federal Communications Commission.

References

External links

RHC
Radio stations disestablished in 2011
Defunct radio stations in the United States
Radio stations established in 2004
2004 establishments in Texas
2011 disestablishments in Texas
RHC